"Crush" is a song by Malaysian artist Yuna featuring American singer Usher. It was released as a single from Yuna's third international studio album, Chapters (2016).

Commercial performance
The song peaked at No. 3 on the US Adult R&B Billboard chart. "Crush" was Yuna's first RIAA certified gold song with sales of 500,000 copies by April 2019, three years after it was released.

Music video 
The official music video for "Crush" was released on April 26, 2016 on Yuna's official Vevo account. Since its release, it has gained over 100 million views. The greyscale music video itself features Yuna and Usher singing in front of a historical building.

Chart performance

Awards and recognition

Certifications

References

Usher (musician) songs
2016 singles
2016 songs
Songs written by Usher (musician)
Black-and-white music videos
Songs written by Yuna (singer)
Yuna (singer) songs